Transtillaspis tungurahuana is a species of moth of the family Tortricidae. It is found in Tungurahua Province, Ecuador.

The wingspan is 20 mm. The ground colour of the forewings is ferruginous with darker transverse
strigulation (fine streaks) and cream dots. The hindwings are brownish grey.

Etymology
The species name refers to the type locality, which is situated in Tungurahua Province.

References

Moths described in 2005
Transtillaspis
Moths of South America
Taxa named by Józef Razowski